Toyota Stadium is a soccer-specific stadium located in Frisco, a suburb of Dallas, Texas, United States. Built and owned by the city of Frisco, the 20,500-seat stadium opened in 2005. Its primary tenants are Major League Soccer club FC Dallas and the Frisco Independent School District, which supported the construction to host their high school football games. It also hosts the annual NCAA Division I Football Championship, the title game of college football's Football Championship Subdivision. Additionally, it is the home of the National Soccer Hall of Fame, which opened in 2018.

History
Toyota Stadium was the third MLS soccer-specific stadium to be built after Historic Crew Stadium in Columbus, Ohio (1999) and Dignity Health Sports Park near Los Angeles (2003). It cost approximately $80 million and opened on August 6, 2005, with a match between FC Dallas and the MetroStars, which ended in a 2–2 draw. The stadium seats 20,500 in a U-shaped design with the north end including a permanent covered stage for hosting concerts, similar to SeatGeek Stadium near Chicago, which opened one year after Toyota Stadium. Although it was then hoped the permanent stage would help the stadium increase revenue by hosting mid-sized concerts, the design proved unpopular and other MLS clubs rejected building permanent stages in their new stadiums, leaving the stadium's design looking dated. There is widespread support among club fans for the stage to be removed and replaced with a full stand in a future renovation. The stadium includes 18 luxury suites as well as a private  stadium club.

The stadium played host to the 2005 MLS Cup final, seeing the LA Galaxy defeat the New England Revolution 1–0 in overtime for their second MLS Cup. It was also selected to host the 2006 MLS Cup, which ended 1–1 after overtime with the Houston Dynamo defeating the New England Revolution 4–3 on penalty kicks. In 2016, FC Dallas hosted and won the U.S. Open Cup Final, also against the Revolution.

In 2018 construction was completed on an extensive $55 million renovation of the south end of the stadium, with the primary goal of creating a new space for the National Soccer Hall of Fame. The renovation also included a European-style roof built over the new multi-tiered stand that replaced the old bleacher section, the Lamar Hunt U.S. Open Cup Club located on the second tier, the third tier season ticket member seating area, new locker rooms, patio, store, entrance, box office and press conference area. Although many club supporters wanted roof structures to be built over the west and east stands to provide shade during the brutal Texas summers, those projects were postponed until a future phase of renovation.

Complex 
The complex also has an additional 17 regulation size, stadium-quality soccer fields (both grass and artificial turf) outside the main stadium. These fields are used for practice by FC Dallas, matches for the FC Dallas reserve squad, and for hosting soccer tournaments. Youth tournaments that have made use of the complex include Dallas Cup, Olympic Development Program National Championships, Generation adidas Cup, and the USYSA National Championships.

Stadium name

From 2005 until January 2012, the naming rights to the facility were held by national pizza chain Pizza Hut, which is headquartered in nearby Plano, and the stadium was known as Pizza Hut Park. Nicknames for Pizza Hut Park included PHP, the Hut, and The Oven, the latter referring to Texas' summer climate during afternoon games (and also because the field is well below ground level). On January 7, 2012, the contract linking the pizza franchise with the stadium expired, and the stadium was renamed FC Dallas Stadium.

On September 10, 2013, FC Dallas reached an agreement with Gulf States Toyota Distributors, headquartered in Houston, to rename its home field Toyota Stadium. The 17 practice fields around the stadium would be known as Toyota Soccer Center.

National Soccer Hall of Fame

In 2015, plans were announced that the stadium would be the new home of the National Soccer Hall of Fame (NSHOF). In addition to the NSHOF museum, the stadium's south end received extensive renovations and the entire project cost $55 million and was completed in 2018. The Hall of Fame has two components – the NSHOF Experience and the NSHOF Club. The Experience houses the museum and serves as the location for the Hall of Fame annual induction ceremony. The Club includes specialty seating for season ticket holders for all FC Dallas home matches, as well as multiple event spaces that function as food and beverage hubs on game days. The NSHOF includes soccer memorabilia, modern technology, and virtual reality exhibits.

Notable events

College football

 Beginning in 2010, the stadium became the new host of the NCAA Division I Football Championship, the title game of college football's Football Championship Subdivision (formerly Division I-AA). The contract, originally for the 2010 through 2012 seasons, has been extended three times: first through the 2015 season, next through the 2019 season, and most recently through the 2024 season with an option for the 2025 season. The game had been played for the previous 13 seasons in Chattanooga, Tennessee.
 The Frisco Bowl postseason college football game had its inaugural game played at the stadium on December 20, 2017. As of 2021 the bowl continues to be held annually.
The 2020 edition of the New Mexico Bowl between the University of Hawaii and University of Houston was scheduled in Toyota Stadium for December 24, 2020 due to COVID-19 restrictions in New Mexico.
 In 2021, the Frisco Football Classic will be held in Toyota Stadium. The NCAA approved the bowl game in order to accommodate all 83 bowl-eligible teams; otherwise, one bowl-eligible team would not have been selected for a bowl game. The added bowl game essentially serves as a replacement of the canceled San Francisco Bowl.

Soccer
 In December 2008, the stadium hosted the NCAA Men's College Cup. In the semifinals, North Carolina defeated Wake Forest, and Maryland defeated St. John's. Maryland defeated North Carolina in the final.
 On August 5, 2010, a then-record crowd of 21,193 saw FC Dallas and Inter Milan, fresh off victory in the 2010 UEFA Champions League Final, play to a 2–2 exhibition tie.
On March 19, 2011, FC Dallas opened the 2011 season against the Chicago Fire with a 1–1 tie. The game was the team's first ever regular season sellout (20,145 spectators).
On July 28, 2012, FC Dallas set a single-game attendance record of 22,565 when the visiting LA Galaxy defeated Dallas 1–0.
 The stadium played host to the inaugural men's soccer tournament of the American Athletic Conference.
 The stadium played host to matches in the 2015, 2017, and 2019 CONCACAF Gold Cup.
 The stadium also hosted the 2016 CONCACAF Women's Olympic Qualifier. It also hosted the second leg of the 2016 Men's Olympic Qualifying Playoff between the United States and Colombia.

Concerts
In August 2008, the stadium hosted the heavy metal/hard rock festival tour Ozzfest. It has regularly hosted concerts by Jimmy Buffett. It was also the site for several editions of Edgefest organized by former Dallas alternative rock station KDGE.

Notable concerts

Dr. Pink Field
North of the main stadium is Dr. Pink Field, a mini-stadium named after former Frisco doctor Dr. Erwin G. Pink. The field is used for Frisco ISD high school football and soccer.

Dr. Pink Field formerly hosted games for the Frisco Griffins Rugby Club. The Griffins drew an attendance of a few hundred people per game.

See also

List of sports venues with the name Toyota

References

External links
Official website
Toyota Stadium (Texas) at StadiumDB.com

Major League Soccer stadiums
Sports venues in the Dallas–Fort Worth metroplex
FC Dallas
American football venues in the Dallas–Fort Worth metroplex
College football venues
Frisco Bowl
High school football venues in Texas
Soccer venues in Texas
Rugby union stadiums in Texas
Toyota
CONCACAF Gold Cup stadiums
Music venues in Texas
Sports in Frisco, Texas
2005 establishments in Texas
Sports venues completed in 2005
USL League One stadiums
North Texas SC
Sports complexes in the United States